Anastasia Olegovna Udaltsova (born 2 September 1978) is a Russian politician and member of the 8th State Duma.

Born in Cherkasy, Ukraine, Anastasia received Russian citizenship in 1998. Before moving to Moscow, she was briefly a member of the Communist Party of Ukraine. Then for two years she joined the Eduard Limonov's National Bolshevik Party. In 2000 Anastasia met Sergei Udaltsov, coordinator of the Vanguard of Red Youth, whom she married a year later. They have two sons.

After the Left Front was founded in 2008, Udaltsova became its press secretary. She took an active part in 2011 post-election rallies, and after Sergei Udaltsov was arrested in the Bolotnaya Square case, Anastasia acted as the coordinator of the Left Front.

Since 2013 she has been an assistant to the Communist State Duma member Valery Rashkin. In 2019, she ran for the Moscow City Duma in district 5, supported by Navalny's "Smart Voting". Udaltsova was narrowly defeated by pro-government candidate, TV presenter Roman Babayan.

In June 2021, she was nominated by the Communist Party for the 8th State Duma of Russia in the Nagatinsky constituency, her main rival was United Russia's Svetlana Razvorotneva. Leading in the three-day voting, Udaltsova lost election after the e-votes were talled and declared. The media also reported on massive abuse of early voting in favor of United Russia party.

On 2 June 2022, CPRF leader Gennady Zyuganov announced that Anastasia Udaltsova would be given the seat of Valery Rashkin, who was stripped of his parliamentary immunity.

Sanctions
In December 2022 the EU sanctioned Anastasia Udaltsova in relation to the 2022 Russian invasion of Ukraine.

References 

1978 births
Living people
Politicians from Cherkasy
Eighth convocation members of the State Duma (Russian Federation)
21st-century Russian women politicians
Ukrainian emigrants to Russia